The vice-presidents of Myanmar (also known as Burma) are the second highest-ranking posts in the government of the Republic of the Union of Myanmar. The offices were established by the 2008 Myanmar constitution and rank directly below the president. The offices came into effect on 30 March 2011, when the new government assumed de jure power and essentially function in the same manner as any other deputy head of state. There are two vice-presidential posts in the government, but no distinction is officially made between them. It can be assumed that the posts follow the order of seniority, much like the ones practised by the Vice Premier of the People's Republic of China.

Vice-Presidents in Socialist Republic of the Union of Burma
The position of Vice President of Socialist Republic of the Union of Burma was created in 1985 by two changes in the Constitution of Burma and in the basic law of the Burma Socialist Programme Party.

First Vice-Presidents after 2011

Second Vice-Presidents after 2011

See also
 Myanmar
 Politics of Myanmar
 List of colonial governors of Burma
 President of Myanmar
 List of presidents of Myanmar
 Prime Minister of Myanmar
 List of prime ministers of Myanmar
 State Counsellor of Myanmar
 Chairman of the State Administration Council
 Lists of office-holders

References

External links

Lists of Burmese people
 
2011 establishments in Myanmar